John Molyneux may refer to:

Politicians
 John Molyneux (academic) (1948–2022), British socialist writer and Marxist politician
 John Molyneux (MP for Nottinghamshire) (died 1588), MP for Nottinghamshire
 John Molyneux (MP for Liverpool), in 1584, MP for Liverpool
 John Molyneux (MP for Wigan), represented Wigan (UK Parliament constituency)

Others
 Sir John Molyneux, 1st Baronet (fl. 1605–1640), High Sheriff of Nottinghamshire
 John Molyneux (footballer) (1931–2018), footballer for Liverpool F.C. in the 1950s
 John Molyneux (Trotskyist) (1948–2022), British Trotskyist, academic and author
 John Molyneux (VC) (1890–1972), recipient of the Victoria Cross